This is a list of notable people who are from Kingston, Ontario, lived, or have spent a large part or formative part of their career in that city.

A

The Abrams - John and James
Bryan Adams
Bryan Allen
Grant Allen
Syl Apps
Scott Arniel
Ian Arthur
Sean Avery

B
Rob Bagg
Rob Baker
Edgar Benson
Leonard Birchall
Norman L. Bowen
Molly Brant
Matt Brash (baseball)
Kip Brennan

C
Wallace Bruce Matthews Carruthers
John Solomon Cartwright
Wayne Cashman
Don Cherry
Joe Chithalen
Alice Chown
Chris Clifford
Paul Coffey
Bill Cook
Bun Cook
Matt Cooke
Helen Cooper
William Coverdale
Thomas Cromwell
Tim Cronk
Michael Crummey
Oamo Culbreath

D
Bob Dailey
Ted Darling
William Rupert Davies
Rob Davison
Hugh Dillon
Jim Dorey
Gord Downie
Ned Dickens

E
Chaucer Elliott
Wally Elmer
John Erskine

F
Lorne Ferguson
Bill Fitsell
John Frizzell

G
John Gerretsen
Mark Gerretsen
Michael Giffin
Doug Gilmour
Mike Gillis
Robert Hampton Gray
Cory Greenwood

H
Taylor Hall
Sarah Harmer
Scott Harrington
James Edwin Hawley
Jayna Hefford
Steven Heighton
Karin Helmstaedt
David Helwig
Maggie Helwig
Jack Hendrickson
Ted Hsu
Helen Humphreys
Sasha "Scarlett" Hostyn

J
James Jerome
Brent Johnson

K
Matt Kirk
George Macaulay Kirkpatrick

L
Hugh Le Caine
Amanda Leveille
Ryan Letourneau
David Ling
Ken Linseman

M
Evan MacColl
Flora MacDonald
John A. Macdonald
James Macdonnell
Gary MacGregor
Ryan Malcolm
Gus Marker
Tom Marshall
John Matheson
Jay McClement
Mike McCullough
Bruce McDonald
Jay McKee
Matt McQuillan
Tony McKegney
Ari Millen
Peter Milliken
Mike Moffatt
Gordon Monahan
Oliver Mowat
Marjan Mozetich
Kirk Muller
Elon Musk
Robert Mundell
Bob Murray

N
Bernie Nicholls
Keith Norton

O
Fred O'Donnell
Matt O'Donnell
Michael Ondaatje

P
Rick Paterson
Ron Plumb
Arthur Edward Potts

R
Andrew Raycroft
Craig Rivet
John Robertson
Taylor Robertson
Jessamyn Rodriguez
Norman McLeod Rogers
Dwight Ross
Annie Rothwell
Nicky Romero
Patricia Rozema
Rusty Ryan (actor)

S
Hugh Segal
Polly Shannon
Peter Short
Duncan G. Sinclair
Gord Sinclair
David Sweet
Harry Sinden
Carolyn Smart
Arthur Britton Smith
Mike Smith
Rick Smith
Chris St. Clair
George F.G. Stanley
Henry Starnes 
Dee Sterling
James T. Sutherland
Andy Sutton

T
Judith Thompson
John Tripp

U
David Usher

V
Gabriel Vilardi

W
Bronwen Wallace
Flat Walsh
Ken Watkin
Bill Welychka
Simon Whitfield
Gary Wilson
Jeremy Wang
Daniel Woolf

Y
Zal Yanovsky

References

 
Kingston
Kingston